Mourilyan is a town and locality in the Cassowary Coast Region, Queensland, Australia. It was established around the Mourilyan sugar mill which provided much of the employment in the area until it was destroyed by Cyclone Larry on 20 March 2006.

Geography 

History

Construction of the Mourilyan sugar mill began in 1882, rendering it among the oldest in Australia. Excavation of the site was undertaken mainly  by Kanakas, with assistance from Chinese and Anglo-Saxon labourers. After its completion in 1884, the mill had a processing capacity of 14 tonnes of sugar per 12-hour shift.

In 1913, the Colonial Sugar Refining Company (now CSR) began purchasing sugar refined at the mill. Mourilyan remained a small settlement, growing only very slowly since.

Mourilyan Post Office opened by September 1910 (a receiving office had been open from 1884 when the mill opened).

Mourilyan is prone to tropical cyclones; in 1918, a cyclone caused serious damage to the mill and surrounding community, having a drastic effect on sugar production in that year.

The Mourilyan parish of the Roman Catholic Vicariate Apostolic of Cooktown (now the Roman Catholic Diocese of Cairns) was established in 1935. It is now merged with the Innisfail and South Johnstone parishes.

In 1986, Cyclone Winifred also caused substantial damage to the area.

In March 2006 Cyclone Larry caused substantial damage to many households in the area, and destroyed the town's main source of employment. A major effort by the Australian Defence Force helped restore Mourilyan Primary School to functioning capacity. Insurance payouts have helped to repair residential and commercial properties.

At the 2006 census, Mourilyan had a population of 424 people.

Attractions 
Mourilyan's main attraction is the Australian Sugar Industry Museum, which contains several relics from North Queensland's extensive sugar farming history. It also serves as a gateway to Mourilyan Harbour, Etty Bay and Paronella Park.

Education 
Mourilyan State School opened on 29 January 1908 and as of July 2017, educates 167 students from Prep to Year 6.

Amenities 
Christ the King Catholic Church is at 10 Harbour Road. It is within the Innisfail Parish of the Roman Catholic Diocese of Cairns.

See also
 List of tramways in Queensland

References

External links

 University of Queensland: Queensland Places: Mourilyan
 Town map, 1979

Towns in Queensland
Populated places in Far North Queensland
Cassowary Coast Region
Localities in Queensland